Valhalla, also known as Rosedale, is a historic home located at Poolesville, Montgomery County, Maryland, United States. It is a two-story house constructed of local Seneca sandstone, to which are attached a c. 1835 -story log structure, and two small 20th-century one-story frame wings.

Valhalla was listed on the National Register of Historic Places in 1982.

References

External links
, including photo in 1973, at Maryland Historical Trust website
Stone House, 107 Fisher Avenue, Poolesville, Montgomery, MD at the Historic American Buildings Survey (HABS)

Houses on the National Register of Historic Places in Maryland
Houses in Montgomery County, Maryland
Historic American Buildings Survey in Maryland
National Register of Historic Places in Montgomery County, Maryland